The Oneida River is a river that forms a portion of the boundary between Oswego and Onondaga counties in central New York. The river flows  from Oneida Lake's outlet to its confluence with the Seneca River, where the two rivers combine to form the Oswego River that empties into Lake Ontario.

The river was known to the Onondaga people as Sah-eh, and was referred to during the colonial era as the Onondaga River.

The river is utilized for boating and shipping as part of the New York State Barge Canal.

See also
List of New York rivers
Oswego Canal

References

External links

Rivers of New York (state)
Rivers of Onondaga County, New York
Rivers of Oswego County, New York